Steven Coulter (born July 27, 1984) is an American film and television actor, producer, screenwriter, and director.

Filmography

External links

1984 births
Living people
Male actors from Ohio
Television producers from Ohio
People from Akron, Ohio